Bathytoma tippetti is a species of sea snail, a marine gastropod mollusk in the family Borsoniidae.

Description
The size of an adult shell varies between 35 mm and 50 mm.

Distribution
This marine species occurs off the Philippines.

References

 Vera-Pelaez. 2004, Contribution al conocimiento del genero Bathytoma Harris & Burrows, 1891 (Gastropoda, Turridae, Borsoniinae) en Japon, Taiwan y Filipinas con la description de tres especies nuevas;  Pliocenica, 4 : 107-125
  Bouchet P., Kantor Yu.I., Sysoev A. & Puillandre N. (2011) A new operational classification of the Conoidea. Journal of Molluscan Studies 77: 273-308.
 Puillandre N., Sysoev A.V., Olivera B.M., Couloux A. & Bouchet P. (2010) Loss of planktotrophy and speciation: geographical fragmentation in the deep-water gastropod genus Bathytoma (Gastropoda, Conoidea) in the western Pacific. Biodiversity and Systematics 8(3): 371-394. page(s): 379

External links
 
 MNHN, Paris: Bathytoma tippetti

tippetti
Gastropods described in 2004